Renzo Bariviera (born 16 February 1949) is a retired Italian professional basketball player. In 2012, he was inducted into the Italian Basketball Hall of Fame. His elder brother, Vendramino, was an Olympic cyclist.

Professional career
Bariviera won 2 EuroLeague championships, in 1982 and 1983.

Italian national team
Bariviera was a part of the senior Italian national basketball team that won bronze medals at the 1971 EuroBasket, and the 1975 EuroBasket. He also competed at the 1972 Summer Olympic Games, and at the 1976 Summer Olympic Games, and finished in fourth and fifth place, respectively.

References

External links

FIBA Profile
FIBA Europe Profile
Italian League Profile 

1949 births
Living people
Basketball players at the 1972 Summer Olympics
Basketball players at the 1976 Summer Olympics
Italian men's basketball players
1970 FIBA World Championship players
1978 FIBA World Championship players
Olympic basketball players of Italy
Olimpia Milano players
Pallacanestro Cantù players
Pallacanestro Petrarca Padova players
Small forwards
Sportspeople from the Province of Verona